The Centennial District is a 700-acre section of West Philadelphia, Pennsylvania that contains the Philadelphia Zoo, the Please Touch Museum and the Mann Music Center. The neighborhood sits on a section of town that was the location of the 1876 Centennial Exposition, which was 100 years after the founding of the United States with the signing of the Declaration of Independence.

The area is part of a plan to incorporate parts of present-day Fairmount Park to revitalize neighborhoods in the area for the year 2026.

Transportation
Streetcar service along Girard Avenue is provided by SEPTA's Route 15 trolley.

See also
Parkside Historic District (Philadelphia, Pennsylvania)
Ohio House (Philadelphia)

References

Neighborhoods in Philadelphia
West Philadelphia